Supreme Confession (Italian: Suprema confessione, German: Die große Sünde) is a 1956 Italian-West German melodrama film directed by Sergio Corbucci and starring Anna Maria Ferrero, Massimo Serato and Sonja Ziemann.

Cast
 Anna Maria Ferrero as Giovanna Siri 
 Massimo Serato as Marco Neri
 Andrea Checchi as Don Diego Garletto
 Barbara Shelley as Bettina
 Sonja Ziemann as Giovanna
 Luisa Rivelli 
 Piero Lulli as Franz
 Arnoldo Foà as Armando 
 Franco Andrei 
 Franco Corelli as Tenore
 Nuccia Dalma 
 Fedele Gentile 
 Massimo Giuliani as Figlio di LIsa e Mario

References

Bibliography 
 Bock, Hans-Michael & Bergfelder, Tim. The Concise CineGraph. Encyclopedia of German Cinema. Berghahn Books, 2009.

External links 
 

1956 films
1956 drama films
German drama films
West German films
1950s Italian-language films
Italian drama films
Films directed by Sergio Corbucci
1950s Italian films
1950s German films
Melodrama films